Gloria Davis (born February 2, 1938) is a former American politician from New York.

Born in the Bronx, Davis went to Bronx Community College and Fordham University. She worked for the New York Supreme Court and the New York City Comptroller. Davis served in the New York State Assembly, as a Democrat from 1981 to 2003, sitting in the 184th, 185th, 186th, 187th, 188th, 189th, 190th, 191st, 192nd, 193rd and 194th New York State Legislatures.

She was re-elected in November 2002, but resigned her seat in the 195th New York State Legislature a few days into the session in January 2003 after pleading guilty to bribery. She was sentenced to 90 days in jail and five years probation.

Notes

1938 births
Living people
Fordham University alumni
Women state legislators in New York (state)
Democratic Party members of the New York State Assembly
American politicians convicted of bribery
New York (state) politicians convicted of crimes
New York (state) politicians convicted of corruption
Politicians from the Bronx
Bronx Community College alumni
21st-century American women